John "Jack" Hilton (20 February 1925 - 26 May 2007) was an English professional footballer who played as a forward. He made three appearances in the English football League with Wrexham. He also played for Hyde United, where in the 1949–50 season, he scored 27 goals in 29 league games.

References

1925 births
2007 deaths
English footballers
Association football forwards
Hyde United F.C. players
Wrexham A.F.C. players
English Football League players